The women's team soft tennis event was part of the soft tennis programme and took place between December 2 and 3, at the Khalifa International Tennis and Squash Complex.

Schedule
All times are Arabia Standard Time (UTC+03:00)

Results

Group round

Group A

Group B

Final round

Quarterfinals

Semifinals

Classification 5–6

Final for bronze

Final

References 

Official website

External links 
soft-tennis.org

Soft tennis at the 2006 Asian Games